Penicillus may refer to:
 Penicillus (alga), a green alga genus in the family Udoteaceae
 Penicillus (bivalve), a mollusc genus in the family Clavagellidae
 Penicillus capitatus, a species of green algae

See also 

 Penicillin (disambiguation)
 Penicillium